U.S. Route 301 (US 301) is a north–south United States highway that runs for  in North Carolina from the South Carolina state line near Rowland to the Virginia state line near Pleasant Hill.  The entire route parallels I-95.  From the southern border to Hope Mills, it runs very close to I-95, crossing it several times and having a short concurrency with the freeway in Lumberton.  From Hope Mills to Eastover, North Carolina it follows Interstate 95 Business, a partial freeway that passes through the center of Fayetteville.  Passing through towns such as Dunn, Benson, Smithfield, and Selma that are bypassed by I-95, numerous local businesses targeted at I-95 travellers line this stretch, rarely does it veer more than a fraction of a mile from I-95.  At Kenly, it leaves its close parallel of I-95, taking a route approximately 5 miles east of I-95 and passing through the center of the cities of Wilson and Rocky Mount.  North of Rocky Mount it passes through several small towns, including Whitakers, Enfield, Halifax, and Weldon before passing into Virginia near Pleasant Hill.  Through Rocky Mount the route divides into a Business and Bypass route, and there is also a short business loop in Halifax.

Route description
US 301 generally follows the same route as I-95 through North Carolina; they both enter the state near the South of the Border attraction in South Carolina, overlap together around Lumberton, and share multiple interchanges before reaching Virginia.

US 301 enters North Carolina at the South Carolina border, south of Rowland and north of South of the Border. The highway enters the state as a four-lane divided highway, concurrent with US 501. It immediately meets I-95 (I-95 exit 1) at an interchange partially in North Carolina and partially in South Carolina. US 301 and US 501 continue north of the interchange toward Rowland, and the highway narrows to a two-lane undivided roadway. It goes northwest until passing through the Bracey Swamp where both routes curve northeast running parallel to the CSX South End Subdivision until they enter Rowland where the concurrency with US 501 ends. US 301 then makes two sharp right curves and then one left curve where it passes through Raynham before merging with I-95 from exit 10 to exit 22.  North of Lumberton, it crosses I-95 twice before entering Fayetteville, overlapped with I-95 Business along Eastern Boulevard.  North of Eastover, it encounters a connecting road to US 13 just before it crosses under North Carolina Highway 295 (NC 295), also known as Future I-295, as it parallels I-95 to its immediate west.  Traversing through the cities of Wade, Godwin, Dunn, and Benson, where it crosses over I-40 without an interchange; it joins the southbound right-in/right-out interchange from Exit 90 on I-95 before serving as the northern terminus of US 701 in Four Oaks, and starts a concurrency with North Carolina Highway 96 (NC 96). From there it continues on through Smithfield, then Selma where the NC 96 concurrency ends, and then passes through Micro. At Kenly, US 301 crosses under I-95 then moves away from that interstate again, into the cities of Wilson, Elm City, Sharpsburg, and Rocky Mount, before returning to a more easterly parallel to the Interstate.  US 301 continues north through the towns of Enfield, Halifax, and Weldon, where it joins US 158 in an overlap with a bridge over the Roanoke River, then leaves the overlap as it enters Garysburg. The last major intersection with US 301 in the state is with NC 48 in Pleasant Hill before crossing into Virginia.

History
US 301 was established in 1932, replacing US 217 from the South Carolina state line to Wilson, and US 17-1 from Wilson to the Virginia state line.  In 1934, NC 22 and NC 40 were dropped along the route.

Route changes along US 301 started in the early-1950s with a new bypass (Eastern Boulevard) around central Fayetteville and a new bypass west of Halifax.  In 1955 or 1956, a new bypass (Ward Boulevard) was built east of Wilson.  By 1958, US 301 was widen to a four-lane road around Lumberton, Fayetteville, and between Kenly and Rocky Mount; it was also at this time that Elm City was bypassed. In 1961, I-95 was overlapped with US 301 on the Lumberton bypass. By 1984, US 301 was extended south along I-95 to exit 10, keeping its routing through Rowland.

From 1978 to 1986, US 301 was overlapped by a second I-95 Business Loop between Kenly and Rocky Mount, which also used part of what is today an extension of NC 4.

U.S. Route 217

U.S. Route 217 (US 217) was an original U.S. Highway, established in 1926, and was completely overlapped with NC 22. The original highway continued south into South Carolina to end in Pee Dee. US 217 entered from South Carolina south of Rowland where it went north through Rowland and into Lumberton via Hilly Branch Road and 5th Street. Going north on Pine Street and Fayetteville Road, it connected with Fayetteville where it went north on Gillespie Street, then east on Person Street, before it went north again on Dunn Road. Entering Dunn on Clinton Street, it went west on Cumberland Street (NC 60), then north on Ellis Avenue. It entered Smithfield on 3rd Street, and went east on Market Street then north again on 8th Street. As it approached Wilson from the south, it ended at US 17-1/NC 40 (Dixie Inn Road). In 1932, the entire route was renumbered as part of US 301.

Junction list

See also
 
 
 Special routes of U.S. Route 301
 North Carolina Bicycle Route 5 - Concurrent with US 301 from Wade Stedman Road to Sisk Culbreth Road in Wade

References

External links

 
 NCRoads.com: U.S. 217
 NCRoads.com: U.S. 301

01-3
 North Carolina
Transportation in Fayetteville, North Carolina
Transportation in Robeson County, North Carolina
Transportation in Cumberland County, North Carolina
Transportation in Harnett County, North Carolina
Transportation in Johnston County, North Carolina
Transportation in Wilson County, North Carolina
Transportation in Nash County, North Carolina
Transportation in Edgecombe County, North Carolina
Transportation in Halifax County, North Carolina
Transportation in Northampton County, North Carolina
Historic Albemarle Tour